Miller Creek is a stream in Wayne County in the U.S. state of Missouri. It is a tributary of Black River.

Miller Creek has the name of Ezekiel Miller, an early citizen.

See also
List of rivers of Missouri

References

Rivers of Wayne County, Missouri
Rivers of Missouri